Ned Shera (born 1931) is an American former politician in the state of Washington. He served the 28th district from 1969 to 1973.

References

Living people
1931 births
Politicians from Seattle
Republican Party members of the Washington House of Representatives